Patrick Ehelechner (born September 23, 1984) is a German retired professional ice hockey goaltender.

Playing career
Ehelechner was the 139th overall pick in the 2003 NHL Entry Draft for the San Jose Sharks. He began his professional career in the Deutsche Eishockey Liga with the Hannover Scorpions in 2002. Between 2003 and 2005, Ehelechner played with the Sudbury Wolves of the Ontario Hockey League. He played the 2005–06 season for the Adler Mannheim and the Füchse Duisburg. On July 26, 2006, he was traded along with Nils Ekman from the Sharks to the Penguins in exchange for a second round pick in the 2007 NHL Entry Draft.

References

External links
 

1984 births
Living people
Adler Mannheim players
Augsburger Panther players
Füchse Duisburg players
German ice hockey goaltenders
Hannover Scorpions players
Nürnberg Ice Tigers players
San Jose Sharks draft picks
People from Rosenheim
Sportspeople from Upper Bavaria
Starbulls Rosenheim players
Sudbury Wolves players